Amphitrites origins are obscure. She first appeared in Lloyd's Register in 1789. Her entry notes that she had been almost rebuilt in 1783 and had undergone a good repair in 1788, presumably under a different name. From 1789 to 1799 she was a whaler in the Northern (Greenland) Whale Fishery. She then started on a voyage as a slave ship but capsized off the coast of Africa.

Career

Slave voyage and loss 
Captain James Cosnahan acquired a letter of marque on 20 March 1799. Cosnachan (or Cosmacher) sailed Amphitrite (or Amphitut) from Liverpool on 16 June, bound for Bonny; she was legally allowed to transport up to 470 slaves.

Lloyd's List (LL) reported on 10 January 1800 that Amphitrite, Cochrane, master, had capsized at New Calabar, Africa.

The Trans Atlantic Slave Trade database has Amphitrite being captured. However, there were two Amphitrites of Liverpool that were engaged in gathering slaves off the coast of Africa in late 1799, and both were lost.

Citations and references
Citations

References

1780s ships
Whaling ships
Age of Sail merchant ships of England
Liverpool slave ships
Maritime incidents in 1807